is a 2006 film set in Japan of the Edo period. It is the final film in Yoji Yamada's acclaimed Samurai Trilogy, following Twilight Samurai (2002) and The Hidden Blade (2004).

Plot
Shinnojo, a low level samurai, lives with his pretty and loyal wife Kayo. Bored with his position as a food-taster for a feudal lord, he talks about opening a kendo school open to boys of all castes. Before he can act, he becomes ill after tasting some whelk sashimi. An investigation reveals that the poisoning was not a human conspiracy, but a poor choice of food out of season. After three days, he awakes but finds that the toxin has blinded him.

His uncle is asked by Shinnojo's family how the couple will survive. He laments that he no longer knows anybody with influence, and asks Kayo if she knows of anybody. She relates how Toya Shimada, the chief duty officer in the castle and a samurai of high rank, offered to help and they tell her to act upon his offer of assistance.

A message from the castle brings the good news that Shinnojo's stipend of rice will remain the same, and for life but his aunt tells him that Kayo was seen with another man. He has Tokuhei, his faithful servant, follow her. Kayo notices that she is being followed, and although Tokuhei offers to cover for her, she reveals to Shinnojo that Shimada offered to help but at a price, shown when he forced himself upon her. He then solicited additional trysts by threatening to tell Shinnojo about the first. An enraged Shinnojo divorces her and orders her out of his house.

When it is revealed to him that Shimada had nothing to do with maintaining his stipend, but that it came out of gratitude from the lord of the clan himself, Shinnojo seeks to renew his skill with the sword as a blind man to avenge the dishonor of Kayo. Through Tokuhei, he sends a message to Shimada to set up a duel, with the additional message to not underestimate him. The two samurai meet at the stables near the river to decide their destinies. In the subsequent fight Shinnojo cuts off Shimada's arm. He leaves Shimada to live a horribly disfigured life, telling Tokuhei that he has now avenged Kayo's dishonor. The next day Shinnojo is informed that the injured Shimada refused to tell anyone what had happened or who injured him in the duel. That night Shimada committed seppuku and killed himself, as a samurai cannot live with only one arm. He dies without anyone knowing of his sin against the Mimura family, his violation of Kayo, or his own dishonorable injury by a blinded man.

Tokuhei tells Shinnojo he has found a girl to work in the kitchen and cook for him. After one taste of the girl's food, Shinnojo recognizes his wife's cooking, and calls Kayo to come into the house. Shinnojo and Kayo reconcile, with an understanding that they will begin their life together anew.

Cast
Takuya Kimura - Mimura Shinnojo
Rei Dan - Mimura Kayo
Takashi Sasano - Tokuhei
Nenji Kobayashi - Higuchi Sakunosuke
Ken Ogata - Kibe Magohachiro
Kaori Momoi - Hatano Ine
Bandō Mitsugorō X - Shimada Toya

Reception

Critical reception
Review aggregator website Rotten Tomatoes gave the film an approval rating of 80% based on 20 reviews from western critics, with an average rating of 6.9/10. The website's critical consensus reads, "The third in director in Yoji Yamada's samurai trilogy is enjoyable, intricately made and well acted."

Awards and nominations
2005 Awards of the Japanese Academy
 Best Supporting Actor - Takashi Sasano
 Best Cinematography - Mutsuo Naganuma
 Best Lighting - Takeshi Nakasu
 Nomination - Best Film
 Nomination - Best Actor - Takuya Kimura (Declined his nomination)
 Nomination - Best Actress - Rei Dan
 Nomination - Best Supporting Actress - Kaori Momoi
 Nomination - Best Director - Yōji Yamada
 Nomination - Best Screenplay - Yōji Yamada, Emiko Hiramatsu, and Ichirō Yamamoto
 Nomination - Best Editing - Iwao Ishii
 Nomination - Best Art Direction - Mitsuo Degawa
 Nomination - Best Music Score - Isao Tomita
 Nomination - Best Sound - Kazumi Kishida

2007 Blue Ribbon Awards
 Best New Actress - Rei Dan

2007 Cinemanila International Film Festival
 Nomination - International Competition - Yōji Yamada

2007 Kinema Junpo Awards
 Best Supporting Actor - Takashi Sasano also for The Hardest Night!!
 Best New Actress - Rei Dan

2007 Mainichi Film Awards
 Best Supporting Actor - Takashi Sasano also for The Hardest Night!!
 Best New Talent - Rei Dan

2007 Nikkan Sports Film Awards
 Yujiro Ishihara Award - Yōji Yamada
 Best Supporting Actor - Takashi Sasano

2007 Shanghai International Film Festival
 Best Music Score - Isao Tomita

Film festivals
Official Selection Moscow International Film Festival
Opening Film Panorama Special Berlin International Film Festival
Official Selection Hawaii International Film Festival

Home media
The film was released on DVD by Funimation in 2008. The release contains both an English Dolby Digital 2.0 audio track and its original Japanese Dolby Digital 5.1 audio track (with English subtitles). In 2010, the film was released on Blu-ray (Region A) by Shochiku exclusively for the Japanese market, containing only a Japanese DTS-HD Master Audio 5.1 audio track and Japanese subtitles.

References

External links
 
 

2006 films
2000s Japanese films
2000s Japanese-language films
Films about blind people
Films scored by Isao Tomita
Films set in castles
Films with screenplays by Yôji Yamada
Funimation
Jidaigeki films
Samurai films
Shochiku films